Tender Buttons is the third studio album by British indie electronic band Broadcast. Following the departure of several bandmembers, the album was recorded largely as the core duo of Trish Keenan and James Cargill, and as such is considered to have a rawer and more stripped back sound than previous Broadcast releases. It was released on 19 September 2005 by Warp. Upon its release, Tender Buttons received acclaim from critics but failed to place in international charts. "America's Boy", the lead and only single from the album, peaked at No. 139 in the UK Singles Chart.

The album remains their most recent album that isn't a collaborative project or a soundtrack, and is presumably the band's final non-collaborative project or soundtrack recording following the death of Keenan in 2011.

Reception

Upon its release, Tender Buttons received critical acclaim. At Metacritic, which assigns a weighted average score out of 100 to reviews and ratings from mainstream critics, the album received a score of 76, based on 21 reviews, indicating "generally favorable reviews". AllMusic writer Heather Phares said that the album "strips [the band's] luminous electronic pop down to its barest essence" and "has a uniquely fresh, modern feel. Sparingly applied beats, intricate but subtle guitars, and hazy synths dominate the album, providing a restrained backdrop for Keenan's quietly commanding voice and crossword-puzzle lyrics." The Guardians David Peschek wrote that "Broadcast's recent records have often seemed too cluttered with effects" but that on Tender Buttons the band "managed to find a halfway house between this always engaging but fussed-at sound and … resonant, muscular psychedelia". In a positive review, Paul Woloszyn of musicOMH said that the album "takes you to another planet with a sonic soundscape lent from Stereolab, but developed to be distinctly Broadcast", and referred to the album as "arguably their finest moment".

Writing for Stylus Magazine, Jeff Siegel said that "on its surface, [Tender Buttons] seems like such a simple little curlicue, all Mother Goose coos, descending-scale melodies, and no-wave screech over dinky drum-machine patters … no mucking around in different time signatures, no showy genre fusions, just a single idea … most acts would falter here, but Broadcast pull it off with an easy grace and breezy elegance". PopMatters reviewer Adrien Begrand wrote that "instead of finding a comfortable middle ground, there's more of a sense of tension to the proceedings, the vocal hooks lulling you, only to have electronic noise jolt you awake", further referring to Tender Buttons as "rewarding [and] their boldest album to date." Pitchforks David Raposa was more reserved in his praise, saying that the band "bring the melodies, but then dress their poptastic efforts with whatever ruckus they can conjure" and "there's no … stand-out track on this album (and there's certainly no 'oh wow' moments)" but concluding that "this is still a Broadcast album, meaning it's one of the better things you'll put in your ear this year."

In 2018, Pitchfork ranked Tender Buttons at number seven on its list of the 30 best dream pop albums.

Track listing

Personnel
All personnel credits adapted from Tender Buttons album notes.

Broadcast
Trish Keenan – vocals, production, engineering, recording, mixing
James Cargill – bass, production, recording, mixing
Roj Stevens – keyboards, effects 
Tim Felton – guitar 

Design personnel
Julian House – artwork

References

External links

2005 albums
Broadcast (band) albums
Warp (record label) albums